The Pandora is an operating system, handheld game console and mobile personal computer originally released in 2010. It is designed to take advantage of existing free and open-source software and to be a target for homebrew development. It includes several features that no handheld game consoles have previously had, making it a cross between a handheld game console and a subnotebook. It is developed and produced by OpenPandora, which is made up of former distributors and community members of the GP32 and GP2X handhelds. Until 2013, multiple batches of slightly updated Pandora variants were produced. In 2014 the development of a redesigned and upgraded successor, called DragonBox Pyra, was started.

History 

Development of the Pandora began when Craig Rothwell, Fatih Kilic, Michael Mrozek and (later) Michael Weston teamed up and planned a portable system that would excel in the areas where they thought the GP32 and GP2X systems (from Game Park and GamePark Holdings respectively) were flawed. The Pandora was designed based on ideas and suggestions contributed by GP32X forum members, with the goal of creating the ultimate open source handheld device. When announcing the system, the designers of Pandora stated that it would be more powerful than any handheld video game console that had yet existed.

The final case and keymat design was made by Dave Cancilier (DaveC), who was known on the forums for custom hardware modifications.

In February 2008 the Pandora wiki had already been created; as of 2014, it contains a thousand pages and is translated with the MediaWiki Translate extension.

The initial development and setup costs were funded through a crowdfunding approach where early supporters provided enough money to support a production run, and when the console made it into production, each supporter would receive the device they paid for (what actually ended up happening due to cost overruns is that the early supporters received devices as later sales recouped the initial investment costs). OpenPandora began taking payments on September 30, 2008 and began shipping to customers on May 21, 2010. In late 2011, after production problems, OpenPandora shifted its production from Texas to Germany, delaying production, and the device was upgraded from 256 MB to 512 MB RAM.

As of September 3, 2012, 4600 units had been shipped and 400 early supporters were still waiting to receive a console, as these pre-orders are only fulfilled when sales to new customers are made. Since June 2012, a new 1 GHz model has been made available in limited amounts during the summer 2012. Due to the shortage of previous 600 MHz chips, this new model has become the de facto standard in 2013.

In March 2013, the pre-order queue of the German OpenPandora GmbH company (owned by Michael Mrozek aka EvilDragon) was finally cleared. The remaining pre-order queue of the UK OpenPandora Ltd. company (owned by Craig Rothwell) turned out to be significantly larger than originally reported, and the UK company has requested to be struck off. This means that the original pre-orderers at the UK company are unlikely to ever get their unit from the UK company. Also because of this, buyers have lost their money. Although there is no legal connection between the two companies, the German OpenPandora GmbH company is trying to help those UK customers by offering them significant discounts (if they decide to buy a unit from the German company instead of waiting for the UK company) and by organizing community donations to get them peer-funded units.

As of December 2, 2013, about 6000 units have been shipped. On November 19, 2013, it was announced that the production of the final Pandora batch has been started. About 7500 Pandoras have been made and sold altogether between 2010 and 2014, with further production made impossible due to shortage of WiFi chips.

In 2014 the OpenPandora project opened the hardware design files to the community, making the OpenPandora a kind of open source hardware.

Speculation and discussion about a successor to the Pandora has started on the OpenPandora boards. Features and a demo prototype were announced at FOSDEM 2014; the project is called DragonBox Pyra.

Overview 

The Pandora is designed to be a handheld game console with high-end PDA capabilities, but may also be run as a low-power full-featured Linux desktop. The system by default comes with a Linux OS based on Ångström.

The interface is custom themed to fit the small form factor and touchscreen, analogue joystick, and keyboard-based inputs available. Users can install and run their own desktop environment if they choose. Users may even install other Linux distributions like Ubuntu or Gentoo themselves. It is possible as well to run Android (gingerbread) through a PND package on top of the Angrstrom distribution, while it requires overclocking to perform flawlessly.

One of Pandora's major intended uses is for homebrew gaming and for the emulation of older computer systems and video game consoles, which is possible through efficient use of the resources made available by the Texas Instruments OMAP 3530 SoC. The Pandora developers have already shown working emulators for Dreamcast (Dreamcast emulator was never released), PlayStation, Nintendo 64, Amiga, SNES, Atari Jaguar and Sega Mega Drive software, and the Pandora is thought by its developers to have the potential to emulate most if not all machines older than the Dreamcast.

For software and video games where source code is available (see List of commercial video games with available source code), instead of emulation,  source ports were created for the Pandora; notable examples are Jagged Alliance 2 and Homeworld.

The device is also intended for use as a portable media playback device with a storage capacity of up to 128 GB of data (64 GB SDXC cards) across two SD memory card slots.

The Pandora uses standard libraries such as OpenGL ES and SDL which are freely available, allowing anyone who wishes the ability to develop for the system. Many developers from the GP2x community have publicly stated that they will be developing applications for the new system.

The Pandora is compatible with Debian packages built for the ARM architecture using APT. A Git repository offers the latest kernel source.

Lists on the community-maintained Pandora Wiki keep track of new software releases. Most, but not all, Pandora software is uploaded to either the Pandora Apps, the Pandora File Archive or Pandora Repo websites. The Pandora File Archive existed first and is run by Michael Mrozek. Pandora Apps was launched by Craig Rothwell in May 2010, and is designed for viewing on the Pandora's smaller screen resolution.

The Pandora Repo (yet unnamed) was developed by a member of the community with help from the community. Its use has been adopted quickly as it tends to have the latest software releases first, as it doesn't require developers to enter any details about the application being uploaded—instead, these are automatically acquired from the application itself.

The Pandora Repo is also the first that uses the community created REPO specifications which allows native clients to get applications from the pandora repo without actually visiting the website (much akin to Synaptic package manager).

The Pandora community is also notable for the development of tools required to achieve several successful static recompilations of complex binary software to the Pandora platform. For instance, in 2014 an ARM architecture version of the 1998 video game StarCraft was generated by static recompilation from the original x86 version. In 2015, a similar port of Diablo II followed.

Technical specifications 
There are several Pandora variants.

Pandora Classic
 Texas Instruments OMAP3530 SoC
 ARM Cortex-A8 CPU @ 600 MHz
 PowerVR SGX530 @ 110 MHz
 IVA2+ audio and video processor with TMS320C64x+ DSP Core @ 430 MHz using DaVinci technology
 256 MiB DDR-333 SDRAM
 512 MB NAND flash memory
 Integrated Wi-Fi 802.11b/g
 Integrated Bluetooth 2.0 + EDR (3 Mbit/s) (Class 2, +4dBm)
 800×480 resolution touchscreen LCD, 4.3" widescreen, 16.7 million colors (300 cd/m2 brightness, 450:1 contrast ratio)
 Dual SDHC card slots (currently supporting up to 32 GB of storage each, supports SDIO)
 Gamepad controls with 2 shoulder buttons
 Dual analog nubs; 15 mm diameter, concave, 2.5 mm travel from centre
 43 button QWERTY and numeric keypad
 USB 2.0 high-speed port (480 Mbit/s) capable of providing standard 500 mA current to attached devices, USB On-The-Go supporting charging Pandora
 Externally accessible UART for hardware hacking and debugging
 Internal microphone plus ability to connect external microphone through headset
 Headphone output up to 150 mW/channel into 16 ohms, 99 dB SNR
 TV output (composite and S-Video, both for PAL and NTSC)
 Brick prevention with integrated bootloader for safe code experimentation
 Runs the Linux kernel (2.6.x for older versions, 3.2 in the latest Super Zaxxon firmware from July 2012)
 4200 mAh rechargeable lithium polymer battery
 Estimated 8.5–10+ hour battery life for games, 10+ hour battery life for video and general applications, 100+ hours for music playback (with maximum power management), and 450+ hours in suspend-to-ram
 Dimensions:  (314 ml) (5.51×3.27×1.06 in)
 Mass:

Pandora Rebirth
Based on Pandora Classic with following changes:
 OMAP3530 SoC
 PowerVR SGX530 @110 MHz (newer revision)
 512 MiB DDR-333 SDRAM

Pandora 1 GHz
Based on Pandora Classic/Rebirth with following changes:
 Texas Instruments DM3730 SoC
 ARM Cortex-A8 CPU @ 1 GHz
 PowerVR SGX530 @ 200 MHz
 IVA2.2 audio and video processor with TMS320C64x+ DSP Core @ 800 MHz
 512 MiB DDR-333 SDRAM @ 200 MHz

Similar products 
Other single-board computers using OMAP3500 series processors include OSWALD developed by Oregon State University students for computer science education, Beagle Board, IGEPv2, Touch Book, and Gumstix Overo series. The Gizmondo 2 was to be a potential commercial competitor of the Pandora, but the Gizmondo 2 was cancelled.

GPD Win can also run Linux.

See also

DragonBox Pyra
Comparison of handheld game consoles
Linux gaming

References

External links 

 
 Official wiki
 Official forums for the Pandora and iControlpad

ARM-based video game consoles
Embedded Linux
Handheld personal computers
Handheld game consoles
Linux-based video game consoles
Personal digital assistants
Seventh-generation video game consoles
Texas Instruments hardware
Crowdfunded video game consoles